The Canadian Automobile Machine Gun Brigade, also known as Brutinel's Brigade or the Brutinel Brigade, was the first fully motorized unit of the Canadian Expeditionary Force (CEF) during the First World War. It was established on August 24, 1914, in Ottawa, Ontario, Canada, as Automobile Machine Gun Brigade No. 1 by Canadian Brigadier-General Raymond Brutinel, who initiated the program and was the unit's first commander. The unit played a significant part in halting the major German spring offensive of March 1918.

History 
The brigade was originally equipped with eight Armoured Autocars mounting two Colt Model 1914 machine guns (later replaced with the standard British Vickers MG) manufactured by Autocar in Ardmore, Pennsylvania. Autocar also supplied six unarmoured support vehicles, four "roadsters" for the brigade's officers, and an ambulance.

Field Marshal Sir Douglas Haig wrote that the "work of the 1st CMMG Brigade in recent operations has proved the value that can be obtained from such units, and recommends the formation of a 2nd Brigade be undertaken forthwith." So in May 1918 the 2nd Canadian Motor MG Brigade was added. With the new unit Brutinel's force consisted of the 1st and 2nd Motor Machine Gun Brigade (each of 5x8 gun batteries), Canadian Cyclist battalion, one section of medium trench-mortars mounted on lorries (plus an assumed wireless and medical support). This totaled 80 machine guns and about 300 bicycle infantry.  Canadian historian John A. English points out that this "was the first mechanized formation in the Commonwealth armies and the forerunner of the armoured division."

Structure
By June 1916 there were five batteries in the brigade 
 A Battery (Armoured Autocar)
 B Battery (Armoured Autocar)
 C Battery (Machine Gunners)
 D Battery (Machine Gunners)
 E Battery (Machine Gunners)

Bibliography
Notes

References
Cameron Pulsifer (2007). ' 'The Armoured Autocar in Canadian Service, Service Publications
Dominique and Jacques Baylaucq (2014), 1882-1964 Brutinel, The extraordinary story of a French citizen, Brigadier-general in the Canadian Army''
 - Total pages: 304 
 - Total pages: 352

External links

Brigades of the Canadian Army
Canadian World War I brigades
Military units and formations established in 1914
1914 establishments in Canada
6th Duke of Connaught's Royal Canadian Hussars
Royal Canadian Hussars